Ennis is a former United Kingdom Parliament constituency in Ireland, returning one MP. It was an original constituency represented in Parliament when the Union of Great Britain and Ireland took effect on 1 January 1801.

Boundaries
This constituency was the parliamentary borough of Ennis in County Clare.

Members of Parliament

Notes:-
 a William Vesey Fitzgerald (MP for Ennis 1808–1812 and 1813–1818) appears to be the same person as William Vesey-Fitzgerald, the MP from 1831 to 1832. Walker includes all three terms as MP for Ennis in one index entry. The History of Parliament website confirms it was the same person and that he was also MP for Clare in 1818–1828, Newport, Cornwall in 1829 and Lostwithiel in 1830.
 b Stooks Smith classifies O'Brien as a Whig MP, but the Wikipedia biographical article suggests he was a Conservative MP (i.e. a Tory) in 1828–1831.

Elections

Elections in the 1830s

Vesey-FitzGerald succeeded to the peerage, becoming 2nd Baron FitzGerald and Vesey and causing a by-election.

Elections in the 1840s

Elections in the 1850s

FitzGerald was appointed Solicitor-General for Ireland, requiring a by-election.

FitzGerald was appointed Attorney-General for Ireland, requiring a by-election.

FitzGerald was appointed Attorney-General for Ireland, requiring a by-election.

Elections in the 1860s
Fitzgerald resigned after being appointed a judge of the Queen's Bench, causing a by-election.

Elections in the 1870s

Stacpoole's death caused a by-election.

Elections in the 1880s

Finegan resigned, causing a by-election.

References

The Parliaments of England by Henry Stooks Smith (1st edition published in three volumes 1844–50), 2nd edition edited (in one volume) by F.W.S. Craig (Political Reference Publications 1973)

 

Historic constituencies in County Clare
Westminster constituencies in County Clare (historic)
Constituencies of the Parliament of the United Kingdom established in 1801
Constituencies of the Parliament of the United Kingdom disestablished in 1885
Ennis